Arbor House was an independent publishing house founded by Donald Fine in 1969. Specializing in hard cover publications, Arbor House published works by Hortense Calisher, Ken Follett, Cynthia Freeman, Elmore Leonard and Irwin Shaw before being acquired by the Hearst Corporation in 1979 to move into paperback publishing. Arbor House became an imprint of William Morrow & Company in 1988.

History
Publisher Donald Fine founded Arbor House in Westminster, Maryland in 1969, using a $5,000 loan. Fine was vice president of Dell Publishing and a co-founder of Delacorte Press, before starting his own business. Arbor House was acquired by the Hearst Corporation in 1978 for $1.5 million. Industry officials had previously speculated that Arbor House would merge with William Morrow & Company, another company subsequently acquired by the Hearst Corporation, unless it published a number of best-selling books. Arbor House published Elmore Leonard's Bandits and Sydney Biddle Barrows' The Mayflower Madam, which were bestsellers, but in January 1987, Arbor House reduced its publishing list from 70 books per annum to approximately 40 books.

In June 1987, it was announced that Arbor House would become an imprint of William Morrow & Company from January 1988. Arbor House's employees transferred to William Morrow & Company.

Works published
Notable works and authors published by Arbor House include:
The Mayflower Madam, Sydney Biddle Barrows (1984)
Blood Music, Greg Bear (1985)
The Pianoplayers, Anthony Burgess (1986)
The Bridge of Lost Desire (alternate title of Return to Nevèrÿon), Samuel R. Delany (1987)
Replay, Ken Grimwood (1987)
Bandits, Elmore Leonard (1987)
No More Vietnams, Richard Nixon (1985)
Kiteworld, Keith Roberts (1986)
A Door into Ocean, Joan Slonczewski (1986)
The Frozen Lady, Susan Arnout Smith (1982)
A Father's Word, Richard G. Stern (1986)
Power on Earth: Michele Sindona's Explosive Story, Nick Tosches (1986)
Trumps of Doom, Roger Zelazny (1985)
Blood of Amber, Roger Zelazny (1986)
Sign of Chaos, Roger Zelazny (1987)

Anthologies published
Notable anthologies and editors published by Arbor House include:
The Arbor House Celebrity Book of Horror Stories, editors Martin H. Greenberg and Charles G. Waugh (1982)
The Arbor House Necropolis - Voodoo! Mummy! Ghoul!, editor Bill Pronzini (1981)
The Arbor House Treasury of Horror and the Supernatural, editors Martin H. Greenberg, Barry N. Malzberg, and Bill Pronzini (1982)
Specter! A Chrestomathy of Spookery, editor Bill Pronzini (1982)
The Arbor House Treasury of Modern Science Fiction, editors Robert Silverberg and Martin H. Greenberg (1980)
The Arbor House Treasury of Great Science Fiction Short Novels, editors Robert Silverberg and Martin H. Greenberg (1980)The Arbor House Treasury of Science Fiction Masterpieces'', editors Robert Silverberg and Martin H. Greenberg (1983)

References

Defunct book publishing companies of the United States
Publishing companies established in 1969
Book publishing company imprints